"A Little More Love" is a song written and recorded by American country music artist Vince Gill.  It was released in March 1997 as the fourth single from the album High Lonesome Sound.  The song reached number 2 on the Billboard Hot Country Singles & Tracks chart.

Critical reception
Deborah Evans Price, of Billboard magazine reviewed the song favorably, saying that the song contains "feathery vocals", a "buoyant melody", and "tasty guitar playing." She goes on to call it a "springtime hit."

Music video
The music video was directed by John Lloyd Miller and premiered in early 1997.

Chart performance
"A Little More Love" debuted at number 50 on the U.S. Billboard Hot Country Singles & Tracks for the week of March 29, 1997.

Year-end charts

References

1997 singles
Vince Gill songs
Songs written by Vince Gill
Song recordings produced by Tony Brown (record producer)
MCA Records singles
Music videos directed by John Lloyd Miller
1997 songs